Layne Collette Beachley  (born 24 May 1972) is a former professional surfer from Manly, New South Wales. She won the World Championship seven times. Currently she is the chair of Surfing Australia.

Surfing career

At the age of 16 Beachley became a professional surfer. By the age of 20 she was ranked sixth in the world. Beachley became the Women's ASP World Champion in 1998, and won the title again in 1999, 2000, 2001, 2002, 2003 and 2006. She is the first woman in history to win 7 World Championships, and only surfer, male or female to win six consecutive world titles. She shared the woman's record for most World Championships won with Stephanie Gilmore until Gilmore won her eighth title in 2022.

In 2004, Layne was given a wildcard entry into the Energy Australia Open held at Newcastle, one of the rare occasions a woman has competed in a men's surfing event.

In 2006, Layne was inducted into the Surfers' Hall of Fame.

Beachley announced on 10 October 2008 that she would retire due to her age.

Film appearances
She has appeared in the movies Blue Crush (2002), Billabong Odyssey (2003), Step into Liquid (2003), and the 2001 documentary 7 Girls.

Television work
Beachley narrates the Seven Network factual series Beach Cops.

Beachley also voices the character "Surfer" in the episode called "The Beach" of Australian Children's Cartoon Bluey on the ABC Network.

Personal life
 
Layne Beachley was born Tania Maris Gardner on 24 May 1972 in Sydney. Her mother was only 17 years old and unmarried so she was soon adopted by Neil and Valerie Beachley, who lived in nearby Manly. When Layne was only six years old, Valerie suffered a post-operative brain haemorrhage and died, leaving Layne and her brother to be raised by Neil. Beachley has spoken publicly about personal struggles, including the fact that she was conceived during a date rape and later adopted out. She met her biological mother for the first time in 1999 at the age of 27. Her biological mother already had a nickname for her, "Beach". 

Beachley was brought up in the competitive Manly surfing scene and was competing and winning against men at the age of 15. It was at this time that she developed her strength and style, contributing to her future success as an unbeaten world champion and big wave rider. Beachley was always available when possible for any worthwhile cause in the community, whether it was for sewage outfall protests or promoting the sport and charities to which she is close.

She married Kirk Pengilly, a member of the Australian rock group INXS, in October 2010. They renewed their wedding vows in 2014 after Layne lost her wedding ring while surfing. Layne first met Kirk in 2002.

Recognition
Beachley received the Laureus World Alternative Sportsperson of the Year Award in 2004 and was named the Extreme Female Athlete of the Year as part of the Teen Choice Awards in 2005. She was inducted into both the Australian and US surfing halls of fame in 2006, and the Sport Australia Hall of Fame in 2011. In 2006, she was also inducted into the Surfing Walk of Fame as that year's Woman of the Year; the Walk is in Huntington Beach, California.

At the 2015 Australia Day Honours, Beachley was appointed an Officer of the Order of Australia for distinguished service to the community through support for a range of charitable organisations, as a mentor for women in sport, and to surfing as a world champion competitor. She was also awarded the Australian Sports Medal in 2000 for her back to back world titles in 1998 and 1999.

References

External links

 
 
 
 
 Aim for the Stars Foundation
 Interview of Layne by pro surfer Amee Donohoe

1972 births
Living people
World Surf League surfers
Australian female surfers
Laureus World Sports Awards winners
Officers of the Order of Australia
Recipients of the Australian Sports Medal
Sport Australia Hall of Fame inductees
Sportswomen from New South Wales
Sportspeople from Sydney